Parapsectris is a genus of moths in the family Gelechiidae.

Species
 Parapsectris alfonsi Bidzilya, 2010
 Parapsectris carinata (Meyrick, 1911)
 Parapsectris curvisaccula Bidzilya, 2010
 Parapsectris exstincta (Meyrick, 1911)
 Parapsectris fastidiosa Meyrick, 1911
 Parapsectris ferax (Meyrick, 1913)
 Parapsectris feraxoides Bidzilya, 2010
 Parapsectris ferulata Meyrick, 1918
 Parapsectris griseoflavida Bidzilya, 2010
 Parapsectris konradi Bidzilya, 2010
 Parapsectris lacunosa (Meyrick, 1918)
 Parapsectris modica Bidzilya, 2010
 Parapsectris nigrifasciata Bidzilya, 2010
 Parapsectris ochrocosma (Meyrick, 1911)
 Parapsectris ochrostigma Bidzilya, 2010
 Parapsectris opaula (Meyrick, 1911)
 Parapsectris savannae Bidzilya, 2010
 Parapsectris tholaea Meyrick, 1911
 Parapsectris violae Bidzilya, 2010

Sometimes included here
 Parapsectris amseli (Povolný, 1981)
 Parapsectris buettikeri (Povolný, 1986)
 Parapsectris similis (Povolny, 1981)

References

 
Gelechiinae